The 2008 Atlantic Coast Conference football season was the 56th season that the Atlantic Coast Conference (ACC) participated in National Collegiate Athletic Association (NCAA) college football. As a Bowl Championship Series (BCS) conference, the ACC's constituent members competed within the framework of the NCAA Division I Football Bowl Subdivision (FBS).

The media widely recognized the 2008 season as one of the most chaotic in the conference's history. At season's end, the ACC fielded an NCAA-record of ten bowl eligible teams from its twelve conference members.

Virginia Tech secured its second consecutive conference championship when it won the 2008 ACC Championship Game against Boston College. Likewise, it was the second consecutive season that Boston College finished as the conference runner-up. Virginia Tech went on to represent the conference in its BCS game, the 2008 Orange Bowl, and, with a victory over Cincinnati, ended the ACC's eight-year BCS game slump.

Statistical leaders

Noteworthy games
East Carolina 27, Virginia Tech 22: Virginia Tech is defeated in its season-opener against Conference USA's ECU, which defeats a ranked opponent for a second consecutive game. East Carolina clinched the game after returning a blocked punt for a touchdown, and beat Virginia Tech at its own game of special teams-oriented "Beamer Ball."
Wake Forest 30, Mississippi 28: With three seconds remaining, Wake Forest placekicker Sam Swank makes a field goal to clinch the victory. The win was Wake Forest's 400th in school history.
Middle Tennessee 24, Maryland 14: The Sun Belt Conference's Middle Tennessee records it first-ever victory over an ACC team. It was just their fourth win against a BCS conference opponent, with the previous three all being against Vanderbilt.
Boston College 34, Central Florida 7: In the first quarter, Boston College quarterback Chris Crane was booed off the field by the home crowd and replaced by back-up Dominique Davis. Crane, however, returns on the next series and leads Boston College to a rout over UCF.
Duke 31, Virginia 3: With its first conference win since 2004, Duke ended a 25-game losing streak in ACC play. After a stalemate, 3–3, at halftime, Virginia quarterback Marc Verica threw four interceptions in the second half.
Boston College 38, N.C. State 31: With 23 seconds remaining, Boston College quarterback Chris Crane scored on a 13-yard quarterback keeper for the go-ahead.
Florida State 39, Colorado 21: Bobby Bowden coached Florida State to defeat Colorado in his 500th game as a head coach.
Boston College 38, N.C. State 31: With 22.8 seconds remaining, Boston College quarterback Chris Crane scores the go-ahead on a quarterback keeper.
Florida State 41, Miami 39: A total 80 combined points were the most points ever scored in the state rivalry.
Boston College 28, Virginia Tech 23: Boston College, the only ACC team to have beaten Virginia Tech on the road since the Hokies joined the conference, did it a second time.
Maryland 27, N.C. State 24: With six seconds remaining, Maryland placekicker Obi Egekeze makes a field goal to clinch the victory.
Clemson 27, Boston College 21: Clemson's C. J. Spiller caught six receptions, a school record for a running back. Dabo Swinney recorded his first win as Clemson head coach.
Virginia 24, Georgia Tech 17: After an abysmal 1–3 start to the season, Virginia beat Georgia Tech to temporarily assume first-place in the Coastal Division.
Georgia Tech 31, Florida State 28: With 45 seconds remaining, Georgia Tech safety Cooper Taylor forced a Florida State fumble in the endzone to prevent an almost certain winning touchdown.
Wake Forest 33, Duke 30: Wake Forest's back-up placekicker, Shane Popham, filled in for Sam Swank and kicked a field goal in overtime for the win.
Florida State 41, Clemson 27: Florida State attained bowl eligibility for the 27th consecutive season on Bobby Bowden's 79th birthday.
Boston College 17, Notre Dame 0: Boston College recorded the first shut-out on either side of the 18-game series against Notre Dame.
Clemson 31, Duke 7: Clemson receiver Aaron Kelly caught ten passes and surpassed the all-time ACC record for career receptions with 217.
Maryland 17, North Carolina 15: With 1:42 remaining, a Maryland field goal edged 16th-ranked North Carolina for the Terrapins' fourth win over a ranked opponent in 2008. Only Oklahoma and Florida, the two teams in the BCS Championship Game, exceeded the feat.
N.C. State 41, North Carolina 10: By routing 21st-ranked North Carolina, N.C. State completes its run of the table on the Tobacco Road with wins over all four other FBS teams in the state.
Boston College 24, Wake Forest 21: Boston College back-up quarterback Dominique Davis replaced an injured Chris Crane in the second quarter. With 1:12 remaining in the game, Davis scored a touchdown and kept Boston College in contention for a spot in the conference title game.
Virginia Tech 17, Virginia 14: A fourth quarter field goal allowed Virginia Tech to edge Virginia in the Commonwealth Cup. The win ensured the Hokies a berth in the ACC Championship Game.
Clemson 31, South Carolina 14: Clemson secured its tenth win in the last twelve games of the intrastate rivalry.
Georgia Tech 45, Georgia 42: Having trailed by 16 points at halftime, Georgia Tech outrushed Georgia 201 yards to one in the second half. It was Georgia Tech's first win in the Clean, Old-Fashioned Hate rivalry since 1999.
Boston College 28, Maryland 21: Holder Billy Flutie, nephew of Doug Flutie, executed a pass during a fake field-goal attempt which proved to be the margin of victory in the game that clinched Boston College's trip to the ACC Championship Game.
N.C. State 38, Miami 28: Quarterback Russell Wilson led N.C State from a 2–6 season start to bowl eligibility with its win over Miami.
Florida 45, Florida State 15: Florida of the Southeastern Conference extends its winning streak to five in the rivalry.

Awards

National awards
Dick Butkus Award (linebacker): Aaron Curry, Wake Forest
Lou Groza Award (placekicker): Graham Gano, Florida State

Conference awards
Awards selected by ACSMA (Atlantic Coast sports media association)
Coach of the Year: Paul Johnson, Georgia Tech
Player of the Year: Jonathan Dwyer, Georgia Tech
Offensive Player of the Year: Jonathan Dwyer, Georgia Tech
Defensive Player of the Year: Mark Herzlich, Boston College
Rookie of the Year: Russell Wilson, N.C. State
Jim Tatum Award (outstanding senior): Darryl Richard, Georgia Tech
Brian Piccolo Award (overcoming adversity): Robert Quinn, North Carolina
Jacobs Blocking Award (outstanding blocker): Eugene Monroe, Virginia

Honors

All-conference teams
Postseason awards are selected by the Atlantic Coast sports media association by votes

Offense

Defense

Special teams

Source:

ACC players in the NFL Draft
In the 2009 NFL Draft, 32 former ACC players were selected. The ACC was second only to the Southeastern Conference (SEC), which had 37 former players selected. The Big 12 and Big Ten each had 28 and the Big East had 27 former players selected. Of the ACC schools, Maryland and North Carolina tied for most former players selected at five. Clemson, Georgia Tech, Wake Forest, and Virginia each had four former players selected.

References

External links
Statistical leaders (Archived 2009-05-21), Atlantic Coast Conference, retrieved March 11, 2009.